Takydromus hani, the southeast Asian green grass lizard , is a species of lizard in the family Lacertidae. It is endemic to Vietnam.

References

Takydromus
Reptiles described in 2001
Endemic fauna of Vietnam
Reptiles of Vietnam
Taxa named by Wen-hao Chou
Taxa named by Truong Quang Nguyen
Taxa named by Olivier Sylvain Gérard Pauwels